Brock Brower (November 27, 1931 – April 16, 2014) was an American novelist, magazine journalist, and TV writer of various magazines, including Esquire, Life, Harper’s Magazine, and The New York Times Magazine.

Background

The son of Charles H. Brower, Brock Hendrickson Brower was born in Plainfield, New Jersey, and raised in Westfield, New Jersey. In 1953, he graduated from Dartmouth College, where he served as managing editor for The Dartmouth.  He then attended Harvard Law School but left to study English literature for his MA as a Rhodes Scholar at Oxford University's Merton College.

Career

From 1956 to 1958, Brower served two years in the U.S. Army in intelligence at Fort Bragg, North Carolina.

In 1959, he joined Esquire], for which he wrote profiles of Alger Hiss, Norman Mailer, and Mary McCarthy.

He also wrote profiles of Vice Presidents Spiro T. Agnew and Walter F. Mondale.  He profiled presidential candidates including Hubert Humphrey, Richard Nixon, George W. Romney, and Eugene McCarthy.  He was writing about Ted Kennedy just before the Chappaquiddick incident in 1969.

In the late 1970s, he "helped originate" the ABC News program 20/20 for Hugh Downs and for 3-2-1 Contact (a science show produced by the Children’s Television Workshop).

From 1989 to 1991, he was a speechwriter for Attorney General Richard Thornburgh.

From 1996 to 2006, he taught journalism at Dartmouth College in Hanover, New Hampshire, and was a writer-in-residence at Princeton University.

Personal life and death

In 1956, he married Ann Montgomery, an American fashion model, in Paris.

Brower died of cancer in Santa Barbara, California, on April 16, 2014, at age 82.

Survivors include his wife, five children (Monty, Emily, Elizabeth, Margaret, and Alison), brother Charles, and five grandchildren.  He was predeceased by Anne C. Brower, bone radiologist and Episcopal priest.

Awards

Awards made to Brower include:
 1986 – O. Henry Prize for short story, "Storm Still"
 1968 – National Endowment for the Arts Award
 1973 – Guggenheim Fellowship

His 1972 comedic novel The Late Great Creature was nominated for the National Book Award for Fiction.

Works

Books:
Debris (1967)
The Inchworm War and the Butterfly Peace (1970)
The Late Great Creature (1972, 2011)
Putting America’s House in Order (1996) with co-author David M. Abshire
Blue Dog, Green River (2005)

Articles for Esquire:
 "The Art of Fiction CXI" (December 1959)
 "A Lament for Old-Time Radio" (April 1960)
 "The Great Bubble Gum War" (September 1960)
 "The Problems of Alger Hiss" (December 1960)
 "Who's in Among the Analysts" (July 1961)
 "Fraternities" (October 1961)
 "The Abraham Lincoln Brigade Revisited" (March 1962)
 "Mary McCarthyism" (July 1962)
 "The Brothers Cassini" (February 1963)
 "The Vulgarization of American Demonology" (June 1964)
 "Rockabye" (April 1968)
 "Dylan’s Boathouse" (January 1971)
 "Play It Again, Sam, Bogie, Harry, Wendell, Claude" (November 1971)
 "The Conscience of Leon Jaworski" (February 1975)

References

External links
 Papers of Brock Brower at Dartmouth College

20th-century American novelists
20th-century American male writers
21st-century American novelists
1931 births
2014 deaths
American male novelists
Writers from Plainfield, New Jersey
People from Westfield, New Jersey
Dartmouth College alumni
Harvard Law School alumni
American magazine writers
American television writers
American male television writers
American male screenwriters
American male short story writers
20th-century American short story writers
21st-century American short story writers
Dartmouth College faculty
Princeton University faculty
Deaths from cancer in California
American Rhodes Scholars
21st-century American male writers
Novelists from New Jersey
Screenwriters from New Jersey
Screenwriters from New Hampshire
Alumni of Merton College, Oxford